The Trinidad 48 is a French sailboat that was designed by Guy Ribadeau Dumas as cruiser and first built in 1981.

Production
The design was built by Jeanneau in France, from 1981 until 1987, but it is now out of production.

Design
The Trinidad 48 is a recreational keelboat, built predominantly of fiberglass, with wood trim. It has a masthead sloop rig or optional ketch rig. The sloop version has a mast with two sets of spreaders and aluminum spars with stainless steel wire rigging. The hull has a raked stem, a reverse transom, a skeg-mounted rudder controlled by a wheel and a fixed fin keel or keel and retractable centerboard. It displaces  and carries  of lead ballast.

The boat is fitted with an inboard diesel engine for docking and maneuvering.

The design had several interior layouts ranging from two to five cabin. Typical is sleeping accommodation for six people, with a double berth in the bow cabin, an "C"-shaped settee portside in the main cabin and two aft cabins, each with a double berth. The galley is located on the starboard side, amidships. The galley is "U"-shaped and is equipped with a two-burner stove and a double sink. A navigation station is aft of the galley, also on the starboard side. There are three heads, one just aft of the bow cabin on the port side and one for each aft cabin.

For sailing downwind the design may be equipped with a symmetrical spinnaker.

Operational history
A 2008 review in Sailing magazine noted, "the Jeanneau Trinidad 48 should have been more successful in North America when it was introduced in the early 1980s, and it should be better known as a used boat today. Why? Because it's a solid bluewater cruiser with a sensible hull shape, a commodious interior and a friendly deck saloon-style pilothouse. But it never caught on."

See also
List of sailing boat types

References

External links

Keelboats
1980s sailboat type designs
Sailing yachts
Sailboat type designs by Guy Ribadeau Dumas
Sailboat types built by Jeanneau